Kameno is a small town in southeastern Bulgaria, part of Burgas Province. It is the administrative centre of the homonymous Kameno Municipality, which lies in the central part of the Province. As of December 2009, the town has a population of 4,848 inhabitants. 

The town has a community centre (chitalishte) opened in 1927 and named Prosveta ("Enlightenment"). Kameno lies close to the towns of Balgarovo and Burgas

Municipality
Kameno municipality includes the following 13 places:

References

External links
 Kameno municipality website 

Towns in Bulgaria
Populated places in Burgas Province